International Bancshares Corporation is a bank holding company based in Laredo, Texas.  The company's main subsidiary is International Bank of Commerce, also based in Laredo.

Through four bank subsidiaries, International Bancshares has 217 banking offices and 315 automated teller machines serving 88 communities in the U.S. states of  Texas and Oklahoma.

In 2012, the company was named one of "America’s 100 Most Trustworthy Companies" by Forbes magazine.

In 2002, Tony Sanchez, a member of the Sanchez family that is the largest owner of IBC, ran as the Democratic Party candidate for Governor of Texas, but lost to incumbent Republican Rick Perry.

References

External links

Companies based in Laredo, Texas
Holding companies of the United States